Dan Cassidy (born April 29, 1961) is a former professional tennis player from the United States. He was born in Hollywood, Florida.

During his career, Cassidy won 1 singles title.  He achieved a career-high singles ranking of world No. 74 in 1985 and a career-high doubles ranking of World No. 62 in 1986.

Grand Prix finals

Singles (1 win)

Doubles (1 loss)

External links
 
 

1961 births
Living people
American male tennis players
Auburn Tigers men's tennis players
Sportspeople from Hollywood, Florida
Tennis people from Florida